The Utica Brewmasters played in the New York State League in 2007.  They played their games on Murnane Field at Donovan Stadium in Utica, New York and were managed by Dave Cash, a Utica native and three-time NL All-Star for the Philadelphia Phillies.

New York State League teams
Defunct baseball teams in New York (state)
Baseball teams disestablished in 2007
Baseball teams established in 2007